Barbara Lewis (born 1943) is an American singer and songwriter.
 
Barbara Lewis may also refer to:
Barbara Bel Geddes (1922–2005), American actress and author, married name Lewis
Barbara Lewis King, American bishop
Barbara Lewis Shenfield (1919-2004), British academic and politician
Barbara Paulson (born 1928, née Lewis), American human computer